Sidgwick is a surname. Notable people with the surname include:

 Mary Sidgwick Benson (1841–1918), English hostess and wife of Edward Benson, the Archbishop of Canterbury
 Eleanor Mildred Sidgwick (1845–1936), English activist for higher education of women and wife of Henry Sidgwick
 Henry Sidgwick (1838–1900), English philosopher
 Nevil Sidgwick (1873–1952), English chemist
 Robert Sidgwick (1851–1934), English cricketer
 Arthur Sidgwick (1840–1920), English classical scholar and schoolteacher

See also
 Sedgewick (disambiguation)
 Sedgwick (disambiguation)
 Sidgwick & Jackson, an imprint of the publishing company Pan Macmillan
 Sidgwick Avenue, a road in Cambridge, England
 Sidgwick Site, a site of the University of Cambridge